The Beginning Live (stylized as Zahara: The Beginning Live) is a live DVD by South African singer Zahara. It was released by TS Records on September 3, 2012. The DVD was shot at Carnival City in Ekurhuleni on June 8 and 9, 2012. It features performances from LeRoy Bell, DJ Sbu, the Soweto Gospel Choir and Riot. During her two-day performance, Zahara was backed by an eight piece band composed of percussionist Tlale Makhene.

The Beginning Live was distributed by Musica, Kalahari and SoMusi. It features performances of songs from Zahara's debut studio album Loliwe (2011), along with her rendition of Brenda Fassie's "Vulindlela". The Beginning Live received positive reviews from music critics, who praised Zahara's live performances of the songs. The DVD was commercially successful, selling over 40,000 copies and reaching double platinum status in South Africa. Moreover, it was one of the fastest selling DVDs released by a South African artist.

Background and concert performances
Rehearsals for the two-day event were held at the Pyramid Venue & Conference Centre. As part of the DVD recording, Zahara and Leroy Bell performed some of their biggest songs. In an interview posted on The Sowetan website, Leroy Bell said he felt in love with Zahara's music after googling her, and was honored to be part of the DVD production. In the same interview, Zahara said she was nervous about the prospect of working with Bell. She also said she loves Bell's voice and found it coincidental that both of them have a song on their respective albums titled "Brand New Day". Zahara paid tribute to Brenda Fassie and Miriam Makeba during her two-day performance.

Commenting on the success of the concert and DVD recording, Zahara said, "I feel that God has favoured me, this is just a blessing. It shows that if you remain true to who you are people will support you and remain faithful to you."

Reception

Critical reception
Drum Magazine praised Zahara's performance, stating that her "performance pulls at the heart strings with her passionate and honest rendition". The magazine also commended her for being a "consummate entertainer who knows her way with a live audience and takes them along for a ride in her musical train."

Accolades
The Beginning Live was nominated for Best Live DVD at the 19th annual South African Music Awards.

Track listing

Credits and personnel
Zahara – primary artist
LeRoy Bell – guest artist
DJ Sbu – guest artist
Soweto Gospel Choir – guest artist
Riot – guest artist

Release history

References

2012 live albums
2012 video albums
Live video albums
Zahara (South African musician) albums